Mariia Dudina (born 22 October 1998) is a Russian handballer for HC Kuban Krasnodar.

In the summer of 2017, Dudina tested positive for meldonium at the 2017 European Junior Championship.

Individual awards 
 All-Star Right Wing of the EHF U-17 European Championship: 2015 
 All-Star Right Wing of the IHF Youth World Championship: 2016

References
 

  
1998 births
Living people
Sportspeople from Saint Petersburg
Russian female handball players  
Russian sportspeople in doping cases